Aralia , or spikenard, is a genus of the family Araliaceae, consisting of 68 accepted species of deciduous or evergreen trees, shrubs, and rhizomatous herbaceous perennials. The genus is native to Asia and the Americas, with most species occurring in mountain woodlands.

Aralia plants have large bipinnate (doubly compound) leaves clustered at the ends of their stems or branches; in some species the leaves are covered with bristles. The stems of some woody species are quite prickly, as in Aralia spinosa.  The flowers are whitish or greenish occurring in terminal panicles, and the spherical dark purple berry-like fruits are popular with birds.

Aralia species are used as food plants by the larvae of some Lepidoptera species, including the common emerald (Hemithea aestivaria). There are many colours of aralia flowers. The main flower is whitish aralia.

Some species, notably Aralia cordata, are edible and are cultivated for human consumption.

Taxonomy
The taxonomic circumscription of the genus Aralia has varied greatly.  Species formerly included in wider views of the genus are now included in such separate genera as Fatsia, Macropanax, Oreopanax, Panax, Polyscias, Pseudopanax, Schefflera, and Tetrapanax.

The genus Dimorphanthus, formerly considered distinct by some, is now included within Aralia as a section within that genus.

Species

, Plants of the World Online accepted the following species:
Aralia apioides Hand.-Mazz.
Aralia armata (Wall. ex G.Don) Seem.
Aralia atropurpurea Franch.
Aralia bahiana J.Wen
Aralia bicrenata Wooton & Standl.
Aralia bipinnata Blanco
Aralia cachemirica Decne.
Aralia caesia Hand.-Mazz.
Aralia californica S.Watson
Aralia castanopsicola (Hayata) J.Wen
Aralia chinensis L.
Aralia continentalis Kitag.
Aralia cordata Thunb.
Aralia dasyphylla Miq.
Aralia dasyphylloides (Hand.-Mazz.) J.Wen
Aralia debilis J.Wen
Aralia decaisneana Hance
Aralia delavayi J.Wen
Aralia devendrae Pusalkar
Aralia duplex R.Chaves
Aralia echinocaulis Hand.-Mazz.
Aralia elata (Miq.) Seem.
Aralia excelsa (Griseb.) J.Wen
Aralia fargesii Franch.
Aralia ferox Miq.
Aralia finlaysoniana (Wall. ex G.Don) Seem.
Aralia foliolosa Seem. ex C.B.Clarke
Aralia frodiniana J.Wen
Aralia gigantea J.Wen
Aralia gintungensis C.Y.Wu ex K.M.Feng
Aralia glabra Matsum.
Aralia glabrifoliolata (C.B.Shang) J.Wen
Aralia henryi Harms
Aralia hiepiana J.Wen & Lowry
Aralia hispida Vent.
Aralia humilis Cav.
Aralia hypoglauca (C.J.Qi & T.R.Cao) J.Wen & Y.F.Deng
Aralia indonesica Doweld
Aralia kansuensis G.Hoo
Aralia kingdon-wardii J.Wen, Lowry & Esser
Aralia leschenaultii (DC.) J.Wen
Aralia malabarica Bedd.
Aralia melanocarpa (H.Lév.) Lauener
Aralia merrillii C.B.Shang
Aralia mexicana (C.B.Shang & X.P.Li) Frodin
Aralia montana Blume
Aralia nudicaulis L.
Aralia officinalis Z.Z.Wang
Aralia parasitica (D.Don) Buch.-Ham. ex Otto
Aralia plumosa H.L.Li
Aralia racemosa L.
Aralia regeliana Marchal
Aralia rex (Ekman) J.Wen
Aralia scaberula G.Hoo
Aralia scopulorum Brandegee
Aralia searelliana Dunn
Aralia soratensis Marchal
Aralia spinifolia Merr.
Aralia spinosa L.
Aralia stellata (King) J.Wen
Aralia stipulata Franch.
Aralia subcordata (Wall. ex G.Don) J.Wen
Aralia thomsonii Seem. ex C.B.Clarke
Aralia tibetana G.Hoo
Aralia tomentella Franch.
Aralia undulata Hand.-Mazz.
Aralia urticifolia Blume ex Miq.
Aralia verticillata (Dunn) J.Wen
Aralia vietnamensis Ha
Aralia wangshanensis (W.C.Cheng) Y.F.Deng
Aralia warmingiana (Marchal) J.Wen
Aralia wilsonii Harms
Aralia yunnanensis Franch.

Fossil record
One fossil endocarp of †Aralia pusilla has been described from a middle Miocene stratum of the Fasterholt area near Silkeborg in Central Jutland, Denmark. Several  fossil fruits of Aralia rugosa and †Aralia tertiaria have been extracted from bore hole samples of the Middle Miocene fresh water deposits in Nowy Sacz Basin, West Carpathians, Poland. Several Aralia macrofossils have been recovered from the late Zanclean stage of Pliocene sites in Pocapaglia, Italy.

Notes

References
Frodin, D. G. and R. Govaerts. 2003. World Checklist and Bibliography of Araliaceae. Kew, UK: The Royal Botanic Gardens, Kew.
Wen, J. 2004. Systematics and biogeography of Aralia L. sect. Dimorphanthus (Miq.) Miq. (Araliaceae). Cathaya 15-16: 1–187.

External links

Aralia
Sorting Aralia names

 
Apiales genera